The Charlie Lake Cave (Tse'KWa) is an archaeological site in the Canadian province of British Columbia. Its Borden System designation is HbRf 39. In a waste pit in front of the small cave, artifacts up to 10,500 years old have been found, which are considered to be the oldest evidence of ritual acts in Canada. The cave is located a few kilometers north of Fort St. John, near Charlie Lake.

These findings provide evidence of the northward migration of hunters and bison, in addition, found two buried ravens, which are the oldest traces of rituals in Canada.

Knut R. Fladmark examined the archaeological site for the first time in 1974 and returned in 1983. Excavation areas were opened found paleo-Indian stone tools and animal bones remains. The excavation layers were found to be intact and it soon turned out that the oldest layer is representative of the historic megafauna. This first excavation revealed five layers.

See also
 Goshen point

Bibliography 

 Knut R. Fladmark, Jonathan C. Driver and Diana Alexander: The Paleoindian Component at Charlie Lake Cave (HbRf 39), British Columbia, in: American Antiquity 53/2 (1988) 371–384.
 Jonathan C. Driver: Raven Skeletons from Paleoindian Contexts, Charlie Lake Cave, British Columbia, in: American Antiquity 64/2 (1999) 289–298.
 Jonathan C. Driver: Stratigraphy, Radiocarbon Dating and Culture History of Charlie Lake Cave, British Columbia, in: Arctic 49/3 (1996) 265–277, online, PDF, 592 kB.

External links 
 Charlie Lake Cave: Simon Fraser University. Retrieved 8 Jan 2017

Archaeological sites in British Columbia
Caves of British Columbia
Caves of Canada